Apoctena syntona is a species of moth of the family Tortricidae. It is found in New Zealand.

The larvae are polyphagous.

Subspecies
Apoctena syntona syntona (Auckland Island)
Apoctena syntona laqueorum (Dugdale, 1988) (the Snares)

References

Moths described in 1909
Epitymbiini
Moths of New Zealand